An election to Cavan County Council took place on 27 June 1991 as part of that year's Irish local elections. 25 councillors were elected from four electoral divisions by PR-STV voting for a five-year term of office. The Cavan Road Action Group won four seats; not a registered political party, it was a single-issue pressure group focused on the poor state of the surfaces of Cavan's local roads.

Results by party

Results by Electoral Area

Bailieborough

Ballyjamesduff

Belturbet

Cavan

References

External links
 Official website
 Irishelectionliterature

1991 Irish local elections
1991